Handsworth is a hamlet in Golden West Rural Municipality 95, Saskatchewan, Canada. The hamlet is located about 20 km east of  the town of Creelman on Highway 701, along a former Canadian Pacific Railway branch line.

See also

 List of communities in Saskatchewan
 Hamlets of Saskatchewan

Golden West No. 95, Saskatchewan
Unincorporated communities in Saskatchewan
Division No. 1, Saskatchewan